Lieutenant-Colonel Edward Arthur Butler (4 July 1843 – 16 April 1916) was an English ornithologist and British Army officer. He is commemorated in the scientific specific name for the Omani owl, Strix butleri.

Butler was born at Coton House, Churchover, Warwickshire and studied at Eton. He joined the army at the age of 21, and served in Gibraltar, India and South Africa. He retired in 1884 as a lieutenant-colonel in the Royal Irish Rifles.

He married Clara Francis Butler in 1872 and had three sons, Charles Edward, Harry Francis, and Arthur Lennox.
His son Arthur Lennox Butler was also an ornithologist, and had four species of reptiles named in his honor, including the Australian venomous snake, Chilorhinophis butleri.

Butler was a keen bird collector and taxidermist. His collections were acquired by the Natural History Museum in part directly and also through the collections of Allan Octavian Hume, Lord Rothschild and others.

References

External links 
 A catalogue of the birds of Sind, Cutch, Kaʹthiaʹwaʹr, North Gujarat, and Mount Aboo (1879)

Butler, Edward Arthur
Butler, Edward Arthur
Butler, Edward Arthur
Butler
Butler
Butler
19th-century biologists
19th-century English people
British people in colonial India